The Rod is a left tributary of the river Apold in Romania. It flows into the Apold in Apoldu de Sus.

References

Rivers of Romania
Rivers of Sibiu County